John Kiely (born 1972) is an Irish hurling manager and former selector, Gaelic footballer and hurler. He has been manager of the Limerick senior hurling team since 2016.

Born in Galbally, County Limerick, Kiely first played competitive hurling and Gaelic football in his youth. After beginning his club career at juvenile and underage levels, he later became a dual player at senior level with the Galbally and Garryspillane teams. Kiely won a total of three championship medals across both codes.

He is principal of The Abbey, a secondary school in Tipperary Town.

Career
Kiely made his debut on the inter-county scene at the age of seventeen when he joined the Limerick minor hurling team. After little success in this grade he later joined the under-21 team, also without championship success. Kiely was a member of the extended Limerick panel in 1994 before later winning a Munster medal as a non-playing substitute in 1996. He later captained the Limerick senior football team.

Management and coaching career

Limerick intermediate manager
After Limerick's 6-19 to 2-07 All-Ireland semi-final defeat by Tipperary in 2009, Kiely was prompted to become involved in inter-county team management with Limerick. "I rang [County Board chairman] Liam Lenihan the next day to tell him I wanted to get involved and help out at any level." Kiely was later named as the new manager of the Limerick intermediate hurling team. In his first season with the team, Limerick were beaten by eventual Munster Championship winners Cork after extra-time in the semi-final. The following year, Kiely's side lost out by two points to eventual All-Ireland champions Clare in the Munster final.

Limerick under-21 selector
In 2011, Kiely combined his role as intermediate manager with that of a selector with Leo O'Connor's Limerick under-21 team. On 3 August 2011, he was part of the management team that guided Limerick to a 4-20 to 1-27 extra-time defeat of Cork in the final of the Munster Championship.

Limerick senior selector
After John Allen's appointment as manager of the Limerick senior team in October 2012, Kiely was chosen to be part of the new management team as a selector. His first season as a selector ended with Limerick failing to secure promotion from Division 1B of the National Hurling League before exiting the championship after a quarter-final defeat by Kilkenny.

Limerick once again failed to secure promotion from Division 1B in Kiely's second season as a selector. On 14 July 2013, he was a selector when Limerick defeated Cork by 0-24 to 0-15 to win the Munster Championship. The management team stepped down at the end of the season.

Limerick under-21 manager
On 18 September 2014, Kiely was appointed manager of the Limerick under-21 team in succession to Ciarán Carey. He subsequently guided the team to the Munster Championship title after a 0-22 to 0-19 win over Clare in the final. On 12 September 2015, Kiely was in charge when Limerick defeated Wexford by 0-26 to 1-07 in the All-Ireland final. He ended the season by being named Manager of the Year by the Munster Council.

Kiely's second season as manager of the Limerick under-21 team ended with a 2-12 to 1-13 Munster semi-final defeat by Tipperary.

Limerick senior manager
Kiely was named as the new manager of the Limerick senior team after a meeting of the County Board on 14 September 2016. In his first season in charge, Limerick reached the semi-finals of the National League, losing by 1-11 to 1-21 to eventual champions Galway. Kiely's side were later beaten by Clare in the Munster Championship, before exiting the All-Ireland Championship following a three-point defeat by Kilkenny.

In his second season in charge, Kiely's side secured promotion to Division 1A of the National League after securing maximum points in their five group stage games. Limerick later narrowly missed out on a place in the Munster final, however, their third-place finish in the new Munster Championship group stage allowed Limerick to qualify for the All-Ireland Championship. Subsequent defeats of Carlow, Kilkenny and Cork secured a place in the All-Ireland final. On 19 August 2018, Kiely guided Limerick to their first All-Ireland title in 45 years after a 3-16 to 2-18 defeat of Galway in the final.

On 31 March 2019, Kiely guided Limerick to a first National League final appearance since 2005. A 1-24 to 0-19 defeat of Waterford secured a first league title for Limerick since 1997. In Munster, Limerick qualified for the Munster Final against Tipperary. In spite of Tipp going unbeaten throughout the Munster campaign, Keily's All Ireland Champions beat them to win the Munster championship. The All Ireland Semi Final saw Limerick face Kilkenny. Limerick were favourites but struggled as Kilkenny took a commanding lead and while Limerick fought back to reduce the lead to a point, they lost by the minimum and went out of the championship. Limerick were hotly tipped to win back the All Ireland in 2020. The year started with Limerick winning the Munster League, followed by the National League. When the championship eventually started in October, having been postponed because of the Covid 19 Pandemic, Limerick retained their Munster title by defeating Waterford in the final. Victory over Galway put Kiely's team into a second All Ireland Final in three years. Again they faced Waterford and went on to win on a scoreline of 0.30 to 0.19. This victory gave them back the All Ireland crown and also insured that Kiely's Limerick side went through all competitions in 2020 unbeaten. In 2021, Limerick surrendered their league crown but went on to retain the Munster title following a dramatic comeback against Tipperary in the final, with Kiely's side coming back from ten points down to win by five. Victory over Waterford put Limerick into a second consecutive All Ireland Final. In the final Limerick hammered Cork on a scoreline of 3.32 to 1.22 in what was a complete display from the treaty men. With that victory Limerick retained the All Ireland for the first time in their history. 2022 saw Limerick set out to capture three in a row. After going through the Munster round robin unbeaten, Limerick beat Clare in the Munster Final after extra time. On 3rd July, Limerick defeated Galway in the All Ireland Semi Final by 0:27 to 1:21 to get back to the Final. The final played on 18th July saw Limerick face Kilkenny. In an exciting and skilful game Limerick saw off the Cats by a narrow 2 points, 1:31 to 2:26 to win the three in a row. This was Kiely's 4th All Ireland title.

Managerial statistics

Honours

As a player
Galbally
Limerick Senior Football Championship (2): 1994, 1997
Limerick Junior B Hurling Championship: 1995

Garryspillane
Limerick Senior Hurling Championship (1): 2005

Limerick
Munster Senior Hurling Championship (1): 1996
All-Ireland Intermediate Hurling Championship (1): 1998
Munster Intermediate Hurling Championship (1): 1998

In management
Limerick
 All-Ireland Senior Hurling Championship (4): 2018, 2020, 2021, 2022
Munster Senior Hurling Championship (4): 2019, 2020, 2021, 2022]
National Hurling League (2): 2019, 2020
Munster Senior Hurling League (2): 2018, 2020
All-Ireland Under-21 Hurling Championship (1): 2015
Munster Under-21 Hurling Championship (1): 2011, 2015

Individual
RTÉ Sports Manager of the Year Award (1): 2020

References

1972 births
Living people
Dual players
Garryspillane hurlers
Heads of schools in Ireland
Hurling backs
Hurling selectors
Limerick inter-county Gaelic footballers
Limerick inter-county hurlers